Paul Taylor (born 3 December 1949) is a former football player and manager. For a number of years he held the position of Director of Football for Walsall.

Playing career
Born in Sheffield, England, Taylor began his playing career with his hometown team, Sheffield Wednesday, turning professional in 1971, but only made six first-team appearances before being sold to York City in 1973. He again failed to establish himself as a regular at Bootham Crescent and was loaned out to Hereford United and Colchester United. In 1974, he was sold to Southport, where he finally established himself as a first-team regular, making over 100 appearances in total.

In 1977 Taylor left England to play in the USA.

Managerial career
In 1979 Taylor was appointed Head Coach of Columbus Magic, a position he held until the club folded after the 1980 season.

In 1981, he returned to England as assistant manager of Gillingham after the appointment as manager of Keith Peacock, with whom he had worked in America. He remained in this role until Peacock was sacked in December 1987, whereupon he was promoted to manager. His reign was unsuccessful, however, and he was himself sacked less than a year later.

After leaving Priestfield Stadium, Taylor joined Walsall, where he served as coach and assistant manager and also had a very brief spell as manager. In 1994, he became Director of Football.

References

External links

1949 births
American Soccer League (1933–1983) players
English footballers
English expatriate footballers
English football managers
Sheffield Wednesday F.C. players
York City F.C. players
Hereford United F.C. players
Colchester United F.C. players
Los Angeles Skyhawks players
Columbus Magic players
Southport F.C. players
Gillingham F.C. managers
Walsall F.C. managers
Living people
Footballers from Sheffield
Expatriate soccer players in the United States
Association football midfielders
English expatriate sportspeople in the United States